Brynn Carman (born November 26, 1994) is an American journalist and former pair skater. With Chris Knierim, she placed ninth at the 2009 World Junior Championships.

Career 
Carman began skating with Chris Knierim in February 2006. Dalilah Sappenfield coached the pair at the World Ice Arena in Colorado Springs, Colorado. After winning the junior silver medal at the 2009 U.S. Championships, the two were selected to compete at the 2009 World Junior Championships. They placed ninth at the event in Sofia, Bulgaria. They announced the end of their partnership on April 9, 2009.

Carman teamed up with A. J. Reiss in spring 2009. They were coached by Peter Oppegard in Artesia, California. The pair finished 13th at the 2010 World Junior Championships in The Hague, Netherlands. Their partnership ended in 2011.  In 2013 due to Carman's height (growing to 5'7 at the time), she was forced to retire from figure skating.  She later enrolled at Colorado State University in Fort Collins, and pursued a career in journalism.

After graduating from CSU, Carman was hired as a weekend anchor and reporter for WOI-DT in Des Moines.  During her time at WOI she was covering the details of the disappearance and murder of Mollie Tibbbetts, and the 2018 floods in Central Iowa.  She also interviewed then Vice President Mike Pence and 2018 American Idol winner Maddie Poppe.  In July 2019, Carman returned to Colorado Springs to co-anchor the morning and midday newscasts on KRDO-TV.

Programs

With Reiss

With Knierim

Results

With Reiss

With Knierim

References

External links
 
 

American female pair skaters
1994 births
Living people
Sportspeople from Denver
21st-century American women